Deomali, is a mountain peak in the Chandragiri-Pottangi subrange of the Eastern Ghats. It is located near Koraput town in the Koraput district of Odisha, India.

Highest point in Odisha
Deomali Peak, with an elevation of about 1,672 m, is the highest peak in the state of Odisha. It is situated near Doodhari village, Pottangi Panchayat division which is about 70  km from Koraput via Semiliguda.
It is surrounded by deep green forest, the peak is rich in flora and fauna. This hill range is rich in mineral resources such as bauxite, limestone and gemstones. Deomali is dotted with brooks and deep valleys, and inhabited by tribes such Kandhas, Parajas, Bhumia, Malis and Bhotias. It is not only a marvel for the tourists but also to the adventurous sports lovers for hang gliding, mountaineering and trekking. On this recent days Odisha tourism Department, is taking many development steps to popularize this peak amongst the travellers as a hot tourist spot by connecting the Tar roads, Hill top amenities centre, drinking water points on the hill top, watching towers for perfect view of the arena. Many waterfalls also found while heading for the top of hill.

See also
Geography of Odisha
List of mountains in India
List of mountains by elevation

References

External links
The Telegraph - Calcutta (Kolkata); Deomali hills: Sneak peak into serenity

Mountains of Odisha
Eastern Ghats
Highest points of Indian states and union territories
Koraput district